Laura Jellinek is a New York City based scenic designer known for her work on A Life at Playwrights Horizons.

Career

Jellinek started her scenic design career in high school where designers came into her school and mentored her. She then obtained an internship with the Philadelphia Fringe Festival. She went to college for design began with scenic and costume design, and met her mentor Michael McGarty.
She then went on to get her MFA at New York University Tisch School of the Arts's Design for Stage and Film.

She was touted by Live Design, a national magazine for theatrical and concert design and technology, as a Young Designer to Watch in 2010.

She opened her first show on Broadway in 2017 with Marvin's Room at the American Airlines Theatre with Roundabout Theatre Company.

Awards and nominations 

Source:

External links

References

Living people
Year of birth missing (living people)